Offworld or off-world may refer to: 
in science fiction, the quality of being on an exoplanet or in space
Offworld Trading Company, real-time strategy video game
Offworld, a blog that became part of the website Boing Boing
Offworld (album), the fourth vocal album by electronic rock project Celldweller